The Constitution of Venezuela of 1881 was sanctioned by the Congress on April 4, 1881 and promulgated by Antonio Guzmán Blanco on April 27 of the same year. It reduced the 20 states of the Federation to 9 and created the Great Federal Council, in charge of electing the President. The National Congress appointed the members of this council every 4 years, composed of one from each state; and the council appointed the president from its own body every two years, declared the song "Gloria al Bravo Pueblo" (Glory to the Brave People) as the national anthem, created the Ministry of Public Instruction, and recognized the Court of Cassation as the Supreme Court of the States.

Territorial organization

Characteristics 

 Reduced the number of states in the Federation from 20 to 9.
 Created the Great Federal Council.
 The administration of the mines, wastelands and salt mines passed to the central power.
 The song "Gloria al Bravo Pueblo" (Glory to the Brave People) was declared the National Anthem.
 The Ministry of Public Instruction is created.
 The Court of Cassation is created as the Supreme Court of the States.

References 

1881 in Venezuela 
1881 in law 
1881 in politics 
Constitutions of Venezuela